Mine Kill is a river in Schoharie County in the state of New York. It flows into the Schoharie Creek by Gilboa, New York. Mine Kill Falls is located on the creek where it passes under State Route 30.

Hydrology
The United States Geological Survey (USGS) maintains one stream gauge along Mine Kill.

References

Rivers of New York (state)
Rivers of Schoharie County, New York